Grappler Sound is a sound on the Coast of British Columbia, Canada.  It is in the area of the Broughton Archipelago and located on the west side of Watson Island, which is in the entrance to Mackenzie Sound.  It was named for HMS Grappler.

References

Central Coast of British Columbia
Sounds of British Columbia